"Rascal (Superstar)" is a song by American singer Tinashe. It was released on July 17, 2020. The song was written by Tinashe and her brother, Kudzai Kachingwe, alongside co-writer Alex King, and was produced by Sage the Gemini.

Background
The song was conceived during Tinashe's Songs for You era. The song was first previewed on Instagram live several months prior to release.

"The vibes and energy were so infectious that It felt right to share, spontaneously. Since that day, my fans have been asking me to release the record nonstop! In the spirit of Songs For You I knew I had to drop it for my fans. Thanks to Sage the Gemini for producing – we are on some West Coast braggadocios vibes that, frankly, we all deserve."

Tinashe released a string of remixes from her previous studio album Songs for You, including "Hopscotch", "Die a Little Bit", "Touch & Go", and "Save Room For Us".

Composition and lyrics
"Rascal" (Superstar)" is a bouncy, "groovy, darker" track.

Critical reception
Meredith Kile for Kare11 praised the songs sonic qualities, calling it "an expensive-sounding track". Brooklyn Vegans Andrew Sacher called "Rascal" overall "a great dose of air, moody R&B".

Criticism drew from the song's lyrical content in context of the time of its release of the COVID-19 pandemic. As Joan Summers from Jezebel put it, the lyrics "[are] a perfectly fine sentiment, I guess, if we weren't currently living through these modern times".

Music video
The music video for the song accompanied its release the same day as the song, premiering on Tinashe's YouTube channel. It was directed by Jasper Soloff. The only feature in the music video is a Phantom 4 Pro drone.

Synopsis
The music video follows a socialite trapped in her home while live streaming to her fans.

Release history

References

2020 singles
2020 songs
Songs written by Tinashe
Tinashe songs